The Stockton Street Historic District covers both sides of Stockton Street (County Route 571), from Railroad Avenue to Summit Street, and a portion of Rogers Avenue in Hightstown, New Jersey.  It is notable for its Victorian homes, First Methodist Church, and the Hightstown Civil War monument.  It is also significant for its association with the introduction of rail service to New Jersey, as the first railroad in the United States to connect two major cities, New York and Philadelphia, originally ran along what is now Railroad Avenue at the eastern end of the district.  In 1832, the John Bull, the first locomotive in the country, provided the first steam-powered passenger rail service in the country, stopping at Stockton Street. In July 2015, Hightstown became a Preserve America community which enhances historic preservation, including the district.

See also
 National Register of Historic Places listings in Mercer County, New Jersey

References

External links
 Hightstown Historic District

Historic districts in Mercer County, New Jersey
National Register of Historic Places in Mercer County, New Jersey
Hightstown, New Jersey
Historic districts on the National Register of Historic Places in New Jersey
New Jersey Register of Historic Places